Cream Ridge is an unincorporated community located within Upper Freehold Township in Monmouth County, New Jersey, United States. The rural area is made up of farmland, on which are located many horse farms. Numerous small business line with County Route 539.

Demographics

History
The soil in Cream Ridge is Freehold sandy loam, some of the richest in the state of New Jersey. Many of the early residents became relatively wealthy "gentleman" farmers, with the actual farm work done by tenant farmers. Most of the early families were Presbyterians, Quakers, or Northern Baptists. Some of the surnames associated with the area are Holmes, Meirs, Rue, Cox, Wright, Lawrence, and Ridgway. The "gentleman" farmer lifestyle was dramatically curtailed during the Great Depression and after WWII, although remnants of this bygone lifestyle existed into the 1980s.

Notable people

People who were born in, residents of, or otherwise closely associated with Cream Ridge include:
 Linda K. Meirs (1884–1972), American Red Cross and Army nurse during World War I who was one of the first six American recipients of the Florence Nightingale Medal.
 Ross Scheuerman (born 1993), running back for the Hamilton Tiger-Cats of the Canadian Football League.

References

Upper Freehold Township, New Jersey
Unincorporated communities in Monmouth County, New Jersey
Unincorporated communities in New Jersey